Isbel Luaces McKullock (born July 20, 1975 in Camagüey, Camagüey) is a Cuban javelin thrower.

Career
His personal best throw is 83.63 metres, which he achieved in July 2002 in Havana.

Achievements

Seasonal bests by year
1994 - 72.82
1996 - 73.84
1998 - 80.61
1999 - 82.18
2000 - 83.30
2001 - 82.02
2002 - 83.63
2003 - 81.66
2004 - 81.12
2005 - 79.23
2006 - 76.16

References

External links

1975 births
Living people
Cuban male javelin throwers
Athletes (track and field) at the 1996 Summer Olympics
Athletes (track and field) at the 2000 Summer Olympics
Athletes (track and field) at the 2004 Summer Olympics
Athletes (track and field) at the 2003 Pan American Games
Olympic athletes of Cuba
Pan American Games medalists in athletics (track and field)
Pan American Games silver medalists for Cuba
Universiade medalists in athletics (track and field)
Central American and Caribbean Games silver medalists for Cuba
Competitors at the 1998 Central American and Caribbean Games
Universiade bronze medalists for Cuba
Central American and Caribbean Games medalists in athletics
Medalists at the 1999 Summer Universiade
Medalists at the 2001 Summer Universiade
Medalists at the 2003 Pan American Games
Sportspeople from Camagüey
20th-century Cuban people
21st-century Cuban people